Joseph's Lullaby is a song written and recorded by Christian rock band MercyMe. It was released as a single from the band's 2005 album The Christmas Sessions.

Charts

References

2005 singles
MercyMe songs
2005 songs
Songs written by Brown Bannister
Songs written by Bart Millard
Song recordings produced by Brown Bannister
American Christmas songs